The FullSIX Group is an independent European marketing group. Founded in Paris by Marco Tinelli in 1998 under the name Grey Interactive, over the past 15 years the digital agency has become an integrated communications group composed of 20 agencies around Europe and in 8 different countries (France, Spain, Portugal, Italy, United Kingdom, Germany, U.S. and China).

FullSIX Group has 10 agency networks: FullSIX, Grand Union, Ekino, FullSIX Advertising, FullSIX Media, FullSIX Data, FullSIX Search, FullSIX Retail, FullBooster and Novalem.

In September 2015, FullSIX was acquired by Havas Group in a transaction worth $75 Million. Prior to joining Havas Group - FullSIX was the largest independent Digital Marketing agency in France.

History
1998 = 6 partners create Grey Interactive in Paris.
2001 = Grey Interactive becomes FullSIX and merges with Inferentia DNM (listed on the new market of Milan)
2004 = Launch of FullSIX New York
2005 = Launch of FullSIX Asia in Shanghai, of the 6:AM Network (France, Italy), and of the SixandCo network (France and United Kingdom)
2006 = Launch of the OTO Research network (France, Italy), acquisition of SEMS (Search Marketing), launch of FullSIX Spain
2007 = Launch of Fullsix Germany, of Backelite, and of 6:AM in United Kingdom. Revenues exceed 50 million Euros.
2008 = FullSIX celebrates 10 years. Purchase of FullSIX by its management and the investment fund Cognetas. 
2009 = FullSIX elected independent communications group of the year (France)
2010 = Acquisition of Grand Union in the UK
2010 = Creation of Grand Union Italy
2011 = Launch of FullSIX Deutschland
2012 = FullSIX elected independent communications group of the year (France)

Awards and campaigns
In 2010, FullSIX Group was elected Agency of the Year 2010 in Portugal, and independent communications group of the year" in France in 2009.

Sample campaigns of 2010:
 Sprite "Green Eyed World"
 New Club Med Website
 DIESEL Cam

Management
FullSIX group
 President of the Supervisory Board: Thierry Paternot
 Group President: Marco Tinelli
 Group CFO: Marc Vilalta
 Chief Technical Officer: Yann Doussot
 Group COO: Fabien Rochette
 Group CEO: Benoît Storelli
 Iberia CEO: Filipa Caldeira
 UK CEO: Hugh Baillie
 Germany CEO: Harald Kling
 USA CEO : Melissa Di Memmo
 Italy CEO: Nadia PEROLARI
 Asia CEO: Stephan Montigaud

References

External links
Official Website

Telecommunications companies of France
Havas
2015 mergers and acquisitions